Sourgoubila is a department or commune of Kourwéogo Province in central  Burkina Faso. Its capital lies at the town of Sourgoubila. According to the 1996 census the department has a total population of 39,226.

Towns and villages
 Sourgoubila	( inhabitants) (capital)
 Bagayiri	(821 inhabitants)
 Bantogdo	( inhabitants)
 Barouli	( inhabitants)
 Bouanga	( inhabitants)
 Damsi	( inhabitants)
 Diguila	(967 inhabitants)
 Gonsin	( inhabitants)
 Guela	( inhabitants)
 Koala	(298 inhabitants)
 Koukin	(686 inhabitants)
 Lao	( inhabitants)
 Manefyam	(823 inhabitants)
 Nakamtenga	(661 inhabitants)
 Sandogo	( inhabitants)
 Sanon	( inhabitants)
 Taonsogo	( inhabitants)
 Zoundri	( inhabitants)

References

Departments of Burkina Faso
Kourwéogo Province